The Malcolm Preserve is an  nature reserve in Carlisle, Massachusetts. It is co-managed by the Trustees of Reservations and the Carlisle Conservation Foundation. Composed of former farmland, the preserve has a half-mile trail that connects to trails in Estabrook Woods and the Punkatasset Reserve in Concord.

It was purchased for preservation in 1998 by the Carlisle Conservation Foundation and The Trustees of Reservations.

References

External links 
 The Trustees of Reservations: Malcolm Preserve

The Trustees of Reservations
Open space reserves of Massachusetts
Protected areas of Middlesex County, Massachusetts
1998 establishments in Massachusetts
Protected areas established in 1998